Callum Timmins (born 23 December 1999), is an Australian professional footballer who plays as a central midfielder for Newcastle Jets.

Honours
Individual
A-Leagues All Star: 2022

References

External links

1999 births
Living people
Australian soccer players
Association football midfielders
Birmingham City F.C. players
Perth Glory FC players
Newcastle Jets FC players
A-League Men players
National Premier Leagues players